Fish is an American television series that aired in the United States on ABC. Starring Abe Vigoda as NYPD Detective Phil Fish, the series is a spin-off of the sitcom Barney Miller. It premiered on February 5, 1977 and ended on May 18, 1978, with a total of 35 episodes over the course of 2 seasons.

Series overview

Episodes

Season 1 (1977)

Season 2 (1977–78)

References

External links 
 
 

Lists of American sitcom episodes
Fish episodes